The Sam Kee Building, located at 8 West Pender Street in Vancouver, British Columbia, Canada, is the "narrowest commercial building in the world" according to the Guinness Book of Records.

The Sam Kee Company - originally owned by one of the wealthiest businessmen in Vancouver Chinatown, Mr. Chang Toy (also known as Sam Kee) - purchased the standard-sized lot in 1903. In 1912, however, Vancouver widened Pender Street and expropriated 24 feet (7.3 m) of the above-ground portion of the property—effectively (or so it was first believed) making conventional commercial use of the remaining frontage impractical, if not impossible. After Chang Toy refused the neighbour's offer to buy the remaining land, someone bet him that he couldn’t use the land for anything. In 1913, the architects Brown and Gillam designed this narrow, steel-framed building.  Its ground-floor depth (from storefront to rear of building) measures 4'11" (1.50 m), with a second-floor depth (from overhanging bay window to rear) of 6' (1.83 m). The basement extends beneath the sidewalk and originally housed public baths, while the ground floor was used for offices and shops and the top story for living quarters.

Historical renovation of the building was designed by Soren Rasmussen and was completed in 1986.  It is a tourist attraction and an insurance office.

The building is considered the narrowest commercial building in the world according to the Guinness Book of Records and was formerly also viewed as such by Ripley's Believe it or Not!, but in recent years this status has been challenged by the "Skinny Building" in Pittsburgh. The dispute centres around the fact that while the Sam Kee Building's width varies from floor to floor, and is 6 feet wide in places, Pittsburgh's "Skinny Building" is 5'2" (1.57 m) wide on all floors.

See also

Chinatown, Vancouver
Spite house
Skinny House

References

Commercial buildings completed in 1913
Buildings and structures in Vancouver
1913 establishments in British Columbia
Spite houses